Beau Revel is a 1921 American silent drama film directed by John Griffith Wray and written by Luther Reed and Louis Joseph Vance. The film stars Lewis Stone, Florence Vidor, Lloyd Hughes, Kathleen Kirkham, Dick Ryan, and Harland Tucker. The film was released on March 20, 1921, by Paramount Pictures.

Cast 
Lewis Stone as Lawrence 'Beau' Revel 
Florence Vidor as Betty Lee
Lloyd Hughes as Dick Revel
Kathleen Kirkham as Alice Lathom
Dick Ryan as Rossiter Wade
Harland Tucker as Will Phyfe 
William Conklin as Fred Lathom
Lydia Yeamans Titus as 'chronic' aunt
William Musgrave as Bert Lee, the profligate brother
Joe Campbell as Butler

Preservation status
This film survives in the UCLA Film & Television archive and the Library of Congress and in a European archive.

References

External links 

 
 

1921 films
1920s English-language films
Silent American drama films
1921 drama films
Paramount Pictures films
Films directed by John Griffith Wray
American black-and-white films
American silent feature films
1920s American films